San Severino is an Italian village and hamlet (frazione) of the municipality of Centola in the Province of Salerno, Campania. As of 2011 its population was of 435.

History
Known until 1861 as San Severino di Camerota, the village was founded in the 10th-11th century. The original settlement, located upon a hill, was gradually abandoned during the end of the 19th century after the construction of a railway line. New houses were built in the valley, just below the hill but closer to the railway. Nowadays the ancient village is a ghost town and a preserved heritage, because of the conservation status of its medieval structure.

Geography
Located in the valley of Mingardo river, close to the mount Bulgheria, San Severino develops along the provincial road SP 109, in southern Cilento. It is 4 km far from Foria and Poderia, 6 from Celle di Bulgheria, 8 from Centola, 10 from Palinuro (by the sea), 15 from Camerota and 16 from Marina di Camerota. The modern village is linked to the medieval one by a pedestrian trail.

Transport
In San Severino is located the railway station of Centola, part of  Salerno-Reggio Calabria line, that links the village to direct trains to Naples and Cosenza.

The village is also served by a highway (Salerno-Battipaglia-Paestum-Agropoli-Vallo della Lucania-Policastro-Sapri), at the exit of "Poderia-Palinuro", 2,5 km far.

See also
Cilentan dialect
Cilentan Coast
Cilento and Vallo di Diano National Park

References

External links

Frazioni of the Province of Salerno
Localities of Cilento
Ghost towns in Italy